This article lists fellows of the Royal Society elected in 1949.

Fellows 

John Frank Allen
Richard William Bailey
Sir Frederick Charles Bawden
Francis Brambell
Keith Edward Bullen
Sir Ernst Boris Chain
Ulick Richardson Evans
Edward David Hughes
William Quarrier Kennedy
William Bernard Robinson King
Sir Ben Lockspeiser
Hedley Marston
Sir Kenneth Mather
Sir James McFadyen McNeill
Sir Peter Medawar
Walter Thomas James Morgan
Norman Pirie
Cecil Frank Powell
David Alymer Scott
Wilson Smith
 Sir Gordon Sutherland
 Sir Graham Sutton
Meirion Thomas
John Macnaghten Whittaker
Sir Frank George Young

Foreign members

Norman L. Bowen
Percy Williams Bridgman
Max von Laue
Erwin Schrödinger

References

1949
1949 in the United Kingdom
1949 in science